Bill Twomey may refer to:

 Bill Twomey Sr. (born 1899), Australian rules footballer
 Bill Twomey Jr. (1927–2004), Australian rules footballer, son of the above